Founded in 1991, Eno River Rugby, also called the "Rage," is a rugby union club based in Durham, North Carolina. Eno River players come from in and around Durham, playing other teams in the Carolinas Geographical Union and participating in tournaments and playoffs in bordering states.

Divisions

Current 
Women - Eno River Rugby is the oldest women's rugby club in North Carolina and the founding division of the Rage. The club is always seeking  women interested in learning and playing rugby. No experience necessary. The team practices at Campus Hills Park in Durham, NC, Tuesday and Thursday evenings from 7-9 PM. The women compete in 15s in the fall and spring and 7s in the summer, traveling throughout North Carolina and the Southeast for tournaments and matches.

Disbanded 

Men - The men's team used to include players 21 and over, a mix of skilled veterans and newcomers. The men's division usually traveled throughout North Carolina and other states for matches, round robins, and tournaments. Unfortunately, this team has disbanded. The current men's rugby team is Tobacco Road Rugby, formerly known as Chapel Hill Warriors. Raleigh Vipers and the 

Youth - Known under the youth or "under-19" division, it was the newest division under the Rage and faced some of the best in the North Carolina Rugby Football Union, such as the Chapel Hill Highlanders and schools in Mecklenburg County, North Carolina. Unfortunately, this team has disbanded.

Links
Official Eno River Women's Rugby website
Eno River Women's Rugby on Facebook

American rugby union teams
Rugby union teams in North Carolina
Rugby clubs established in 1991
1991 establishments in North Carolina